"One Rule for You" is the debut single released by British band After the Fire. The song and its B-side, "Joy", also appeared on their second album (first album with CBS) titled Laser Love. The band were due to play the song on Top of the Pops, but due to an electrical strike, the show was cancelled, thus has never been shown.

External links
 After The Fire discography at afterthefire.co.uk

1979 debut singles
After the Fire songs
1979 songs
Song recordings produced by Rupert Hine
CBS Records singles